Lovesick, Broke and Driftin' is the second studio album by American country music artist Hank Williams III, released on January 29, 2002. Hank III has stated that he considers this album as his real solo debut and despises his previous album Risin' Outlaw in particular.

Track listing
All songs written by Hank Williams III unless otherwise noted.

Personnel
Hank Williams III – vocals, guitar
Jason Brown – stand-up bass
Chris Carmichael – fiddle 	
Billy Gibbons – electric guitar 
Randy Kohrs – dobro, vocal harmony
Michael McCanless – fiddle (only appears on Atlantic City)
Shawn McWilliams – drums
Kayton Roberts – steel guitar

Charts

References
 On some copies "Walkin' with Sorrow" is added onto Atlantic City.

2002 albums
Hank Williams III albums
Curb Records albums